Kornilyevskaya Sloboda is a rural locality (a village) in Rostilovskoye Rural Settlement, Gryazovetsky District, Vologda Oblast, Russia. The population was 14 as of 2002.

Geography 
Kornilyevskaya Sloboda is located 6 km southwest of Gryazovets (the district's administrative centre) by road. Svistunovo is the nearest rural locality.

References 

Rural localities in Gryazovetsky District